There are 221 Division I teams in the National Junior College Athletic Association (NJCAA) that play in 24 different regions.

Members

Alabama
Bevill State Community College Bears in Sumiton
Bishop State Community College Wildcats in Mobile
Calhoun Community College Warhawks in Tanner
Chattahoochee Valley Community College Pirates in Phenix City
Central Alabama Community College Trojans in Alexander City
Coastal Alabama Community College Sun Chiefs in Bay Minette
Coastal Alabama Community College Brewton Warhawks in Brewton
Coastal Alabama Community College Monroeville Eagles in Monroeville
Enterprise-Ozark Community College Boll Weevils in Enterprise
Gadsden State Community College Cardinals in Gadsden
Lawson State Community College Cougars in Birmingham
Lurleen B. Wallace Community College Saints in Andalusia
Marion Military Institute Tigers in Marion
Shelton State Community College Buccaneers in Tuscaloosa
Snead State Community College Parsons in Boaz
Southern Union State Community College Bison in Wadley 
Wallace Community College Governors in Dothan
Wallace Community College Selma Patriots in Selma
Wallace State Community College Lions in Hanceville

Arizona
Arizona Western College Matadors in Yuma
Central Arizona College Vaqueros/Vaqueras in Coolidge
Cochise College Apaches in Douglas
Eastern Arizona College Gila Monsters in Thatcher
Mesa Community College Thunderbird in Mesa
Pima Community College Aztecs in Tucson
Yavapai College Roughriders in Prescott

Arkansas
None

Colorado
Colorado Northwestern Community College Spartan in Rangely
Lamar Community College Runnin' Lopes in Lamar
Northeastern Junior College Plainsmen in Sterling
Otero College Rattlers in La Junta
Trinidad State College Trojans in Trinidad

Florida
ASA College Silver Storm in Miami
Broward College Seahawks in Fort Lauderdale
Chipola College Indians in Marianna
College of Central Florida Patriots in Ocala
Daytona State College Falcons in Daytona Beach
Eastern Florida State College Titans in Brevard County (formerly known as Brevard Community College)
Florida SouthWestern State College Buccaneers in Fort Myers (formerly known as Edison Community College)
Florida State College at Jacksonville Blue Wave in Jacksonville
Gulf Coast State College Commodores in Panama City
Hillsborough Community College Hawks in Tampa
Indian River State College Pioneers in Fort Pierce
Lake–Sumter State College Lakehawks in Leesburg
Miami-Dade College Sharks in Miami
North Florida Community College Sentinels in Madison
Northwest Florida State College Raiders in Niceville
Palm Beach State College Panthers in Lake Worth
Pensacola State College Pirates in Pensacola
Polk State College Eagles in Winter Haven
Santa Fe College Saints in Gainesville
Seminole State College of Florida Raiders in Sanford
South Florida State College Panthers in Avon Park
State College of Florida, Manatee–Sarasota Manatees in Bradenton (formerly known as Manatee Community College)
St. Johns River State College Vikings in Palatka
St. Petersburg College Titans in St. Petersburg
Tallahassee Community College Eagles in Tallahassee

Georgia
Abraham Baldwin College Golden Stallions in Tifton
Albany Technical College Titans in Albany
Atlanta Metropolitan College Trailblazers in Atlanta
Chattahoochee Technical College Golden Eagles in Marietta 
East Georgia College Bobcats in Swainsboro
Georgia Highlands College Chargers in Rome
Georgia Military College Bulldogs in Milledgeville
Gordon State College Highlanders in Barnesville
South Georgia Technical College Jets in Americus
Waycross College Swamp Foxes in Waycross

Idaho
College of Southern Idaho Eagles in Twin Falls

Illinois

Kishwaukee College Kougars in Malta
Triton College Trojans in River Grove
South Suburban College Bulldogs in South Holland
John A. Logan College Volunteers in Carterville
Kaskaskia College Blue Devils (Boys)/Blue Angels (Girls) in Centralia
Lake Land College Lakers in Mattoon
Lincoln Trail College Statesman in Robinson
Olney Central College Blue Knights in Olney
Shawnee Community College Saints in Ullin
Southeastern Illinois College Falcons in Harrisburg
Southwestern Illinois College Blue Storm in Belleville
Wabash Valley College Warriors in Mount Carmel

Indiana
Vincennes University Trailblazers in Vincennes

Iowa
Ellsworth Community College  Panthers in Iowa Falls
Hawkeye Community College Redtails in Waterloo 
Indian Hills Community College-Ottumwa Warriors in Ottumwa (Falcons in Baseball)
Iowa Central Community College Tritons in Fort Dodge
Iowa Lakes Community College Lakers in Estherville
Iowa Western Community College Reivers in Council Bluffs
Marshalltown Community College Tigers in Marshalltown

Kansas
Allen Community College Red Devils In Iola
Barton County Community College Cougars in Great Bend
Butler County Community College (Kansas) Grizzly Bears in El Dorado
Cloud County Community College Thunderbirds/Lady Thunderbirds in Concordia
Coffeyville Community College Ravens in Coffeyville
Colby Community College Trojans in Colby
Cowley County Community College Tigers in Arkansas City
Dodge City Community College Conquistadors in Dodge City
Garden City Community College Broncbusters in Garden City
Hutchinson Community College Blue Dragons in Hutchinson
Independence Community College Pirates in Independence
Northwest Kansas Technical College Mavericks in Goodland
Pratt Community College Beavers in Pratt
Seward County Community College Saints in Liberal

Kentucky
Simmons College of Kentucky Panthers in Louisville

Louisiana
Baton Rouge Community College Bears in Baton Rouge
Bossier Parish Community College Cavaliers in Bossier
Delgado Community College Dolphins in New Orleans
Southern University at Shreveport Jaguars in Shreveport

Maryland
Allegany College of Maryland Trojans in Cumberland
Carroll Community College Lynx in Westminster 
Chesapeake College Skipjacks in Wye Mills
Garrett College Lakers in McHenry
Frederick Community College Cougars in Frederick
Hagerstown Community College Hawks in Hagerstown
Montgomery College Raptors in Germantown, Rockville, and Takoma Park/Silver Spring

Mississippi
Coahoma Community College Tigers in Clarksdale
Copiah-Lincoln Community College Wolves in Wesson
East Central Community College Warriors in Decatur
East Mississippi Community College Lions in Scooba
Hinds Community College Eagles in Raymond
Holmes Community College Bulldogs in Goodman
Itawamba Community College Indians in Fulton
Jones County Junior College Bobcats in Ellisville
Meridian Community College Eagles in Meridian
Mississippi Delta Community College Trojans in Moorhead
Mississippi Gulf Coast Community College Bulldogs in Perkinston
Northeast Mississippi Community College Tigers in Booneville
Northwest Mississippi Community College Rangers in Senatobia
Pearl River Community College Wildcats in Poplarville
Southwest Mississippi Community College Bears in Summit

Missouri
Crowder College Roughriders in Neosho
Mineral Area College Cardinals in Park Hills
Missouri State University-West Plains Grizzlies in West Plains
Moberly Area Community College Greyhounds in Moberly
State Fair Community College Roadrunners in Sedalia
Three Rivers Community College Raiders in Poplar Bluff
St. Charles Community College Cougars in Saint Charles

Montana
Dawson Community College Buccaneers in Glendive
Little Big Horn College Rams in Crow Agency
Miles Community College Pioneers in Miles City

Nebraska
McCook Community College Indians in McCook
North Platte Community College Knights in North Platte
Northeast Community College Hawks in Norfolk
Western Nebraska Community College Cougars in Scotts Bluff

Nevada
College of Southern Nevada Coyotes in Henderson
Western Nevada College Wildcats in Carson City

New Mexico
New Mexico Junior College Thunderbirds in Hobbs
New Mexico Military Institute Broncos in Roswell

New York
Globe Institute of Technology Knights in New York City
Monroe College Mustangs in Bronx
ASA College Avengers in Brooklyn

North Carolina
Brunswick Community College Dolphins in Bolivia
Cape Fear Community College Sea Devils in Wilmington
Guilford Technical Community College Titans in Jamestown
Lenoir Community College Lancers in Kinston
Louisburg College Hurricanes in Louisburg
Pitt Community College Bulldogs in Winterville
Roanoke-Chowan Community College Waves in Ahoskie
Rockingham Community College Eagles in Wentworth
Surry Community College Knights in Dobson
Wake Technical Community College Eagles in Raleigh
Wilkes Community College Cougars in Wilkesboro

North Dakota
Lake Region State College Royals in Devils Lake
North Dakota State College of Science Wildcats in Wahpeton
Williston State College Tetons in Williston

Ohio
Hocking College Eagles in Nelsonville

Oklahoma
Carl Albert State College Vikings in Poteau
Connors State College Cowboys in Conner
Eastern Oklahoma State College Mountaineers in Wilburton
Murray State College Aggies in Tishomingo
Northeastern Oklahoma A&M College Golden Norseman in Miami
Northern Oklahoma College Enid Jets in Enid
Northern Oklahoma College-Tonkawa Mavericks in Tonkawa
Redlands Community College Cougars in El Reno
Seminole State College Trojans in Seminole
Western Oklahoma State College Pioneers in Altus

Pennsylvania
Lackawanna College Falcons in Scranton

South Carolina
Aiken Technical College Knights in Aiken
Clinton Junior College Golden Bears in Rock Hill
Denmark Technical College Panthers in Denmark
Spartanburg Methodist College Pioneers in Spartanburg
University of South Carolina Lancaster Lancers in Lancaster
University of South Carolina Salkehatchie Indians in Allendale
University of South Carolina Sumter Fire Ants in Sumter

Tennessee
Chattanooga State Technical Community College Tigers in Chattanooga
Cleveland State Community College Cougars in Cleveland
Columbia State Community College Chargers in Columbia
Dyersburg State Community College Eagles in Dyersburg
Jackson State Community College Green Jays in Jackson
Motlow State Community College Bucks in Lynchburg
Roane State Community College Raider in Harriman
Southwest Tennessee Community College Salquis in Memphis
Volunteer State Community College Pioneers in Gallatin
Walters State Community College Senators in Morristown

Texas
Angelina College Roadrunners in Lufkin
Blinn College Buccaneers in Brenham
Clarendon College Bulldogs in Clarendon
Cisco College Wranglers in Cisco
Coastal Bend College Cougars in Beeville
Collin College Cougars in Collin County
Frank Phillips College Plainsmen in Borger
Grayson County College Vikings in Denison
Hill College Rebels in Hillsboro
Howard College Hawks in Big Spring
Jacksonville College Jaguars/Lady Jaguars in Jacksonville
Kilgore College Rangers in Kilgore
Lee College Runnin' Rebels in Baytown
McLennan Community College Highlanders in Waco
Midland College Chaparrals in Midland
Navarro College Bulldogs in Corsicana
Northeast Texas Community College Eagles in Mount Pleasant
Odessa College Wranglers in Odessa
Panola College Ponies in Carthage
Paris Junior College Dragons in Paris
Ranger College Rangers in Ranger
San Jacinto College-Central Gators in Pasadena
South Plains College Texans in Lubbock
Southwestern Christian College Rams in Terrell
Temple College Leopards in Temple
Trinity Valley Community College Cardinals in Athens
Tyler Junior College Apaches in Tyler
Western Texas College Westerners in Snyder
Wharton County Junior College Pioneers in Wharton

Utah
Salt Lake Community College Bruin Bears in Salt Lake
Snow College Badgers in Ephraim
Utah State University Eastern Eagles in Price

West Virginia
Potomac State College of West Virginia University Catamounts in Keyser

Wyoming
Casper College Thunderbirds in Casper
Central Wyoming College Rustlers in Riverton
Eastern Wyoming College Lancers in Torrington
Laramie County Community College Golden Eagles in Cheyenne
Northwest College Trappers in Powell
Sheridan College Generals in Gillette
Western Wyoming Community College Mustangs in Rock Springs

Note
The schools listed above may not compete in Division I in all sports. For instance, many schools in Kansas compete in Division I basketball while competing in Division II in softball and volleyball. Highland (Kan.) and Johnson County compete in Division I baseball but have Division II teams in all other sports (except Highland football because NJCAA football is not split into divisions).

See also
 List of NJCAA Division II schools
 List of NJCAA Division III schools
 List of community college football programs
 List of USCAA institutions
 List of NCCAA institutions
 List of NAIA institutions
 List of NCAA Division I institutions
 List of NCAA Division II institutions
 List of NCAA Division III institutions

References

Sources
NJCAA Members
NJCAA archived
Kansas Jayhawk Community College Conference website

Division 1
NJCAA athletics